Oregon Route 99 is a state highway that runs between the southern border of Oregon, and the city of Junction City. Oregon Route 99 was formed from parts of the former U.S. Route 99; it shares much of its route with I-5, but much of it is also independent. Between Portland and Junction City, the highway is forked into two routes: Oregon Route 99E and Oregon Route 99W.

Route description
Oregon Route 99 technically starts at an interchange with Interstate 5 at exit 11, south of Ashland.  There it departs from the freeway, running parallel to I-5 as it passes through the cities of Ashland (as Main Street), Talent, Phoenix, and Medford.  The highway rejoins I-5 at exit 35, just northwest of Central Point.

OR 99 departs from I-5 several more times through the mountains of southern Oregon, only to rejoin again a short distance later.  Junctions are found in Gold Hill (2nd Ave), Grants Pass, between Myrtle Creek and Sutherlin (crossing I-5 in Roseburg), through Drain and Yoncalla, and Cottage Grove and Goshen.  These departures serve as business routes for I-5, as Oregon does not have or sign Interstate business routes.

When it reaches Eugene, OR 99 departs from I-5 for a final time.  It heads west into downtown, along Franklin Boulevard past the University of Oregon.  Downtown, OR 99 is on the 6th and 7th Avenue couplet.  (Much of the section in Eugene is co-signed with either Oregon Route 126 or OR 126 Business.)  West of downtown it heads north on an expressway alignment, which continues to Junction City.  In Junction City, OR 99 ends, as it splits into eastern and western forks.

Highways comprised 

OR 99 comprises the following named highways (see Oregon highways and routes) and roads, from south to north:

 The Rogue Valley Highway No. 63;
 Part of the Pacific Highway No. 1 (concurrent with I-5);
 The Gold Hill Spur No. 486;
 The Sams Valley Highway No. 271 (concurrent with OR 234);
 The Rogue River Highway No. 60;
 Part of the Redwood Highway No. 25;
 Part of the Pacific Highway (concurrent with I-5);
 Part of Fifth Street in Canyonville;
 Part of the Tiller-Trail Highway No. 230;
 Part of the Pacific Highway (concurrent with I-5);
 The Dillard Highway, which is no longer a state highway;
 Part of the Coos Bay-Roseburg Highway No. 35 (concurrent with OR 42);
 The Oakland-Shady Highway, which is no longer a state highway (concurrent with OR 138);
 Part of the Pacific Highway (concurrent with I-5);
 The Drain-Yoncalla Highway, which is no longer a state highway;
 Part of the Umpqua Highway No. 45;
 Part of the Pacific Highway (concurrent with I-5);
 The Goshen-Divide Highway No. 226;
 Part of the Pacific Highway (concurrent with I-5); and
 Part of the Pacific Highway West No. 1W.

It followed the Myrtle Creek Highway previously. This section was removed by 2018.

Major intersections

References

099
U.S. Route 99
Transportation in Josephine County, Oregon
Transportation in Lane County, Oregon
Transportation in Medford, Oregon
Transportation in Douglas County, Oregon